The Poacher (German: Der Wilderer) is a 1926 German silent drama film directed by Johannes Meyer and starring Heinrich Schroth, Carl de Vogt and Rudolf Biebrach. Location shooting took place around Innsbruck and the Dolomites. The film's art direction was by Otto Erdmann and Hans Sohnle.

Synopsis
After a deer is killed on his estate, a count hires a hunt to track down the poacher he believes is responsible.

Cast
 Heinrich Schroth as Graf Oetzbach  
 Carl de Vogt as Werner, Jäger des Grafen  
 Rudolf Biebrach as Der alte Dorn, Jäger des Grafen  
 Rudolf Rittner as Andreas Weiler, Bauer in Oetzbach  
 Helga Thomas as Maria, seine Tochter  
 Ellen Douglas as Cenz, seine Nichte  
 Max Maximilian as Franz, sein Knecht  
 Josef Peterhans as Baumgartner, Kaufmann in Oetzbach 
 Hans Peter Peterhans  as Der Geißbub

References

External links

1926 films
Films of the Weimar Republic
Films directed by Johannes Meyer
German silent feature films
UFA GmbH films
1926 drama films
German drama films
Films about hunters
Films set in the Alps
German black-and-white films
Silent drama films
1920s German films
1920s German-language films
Films shot in Austria